Panic in Year Zero!  (a.k.a. End of the World) is a 1962 American black-and-white survival science fiction film from American International Pictures. It was produced by Arnold Houghland and Lou Rusoff, directed by Ray Milland, who also stars with Jean Hagen, Frankie Avalon, Mary Mitchel, and Joan Freeman. The original music score was composed by Les Baxter. The screenplay was written by John Morton and Jay Simms. The film was released by AIP in 1962 as a double feature with Tales of Terror.

Plot
Harry Baldwin, his wife Ann, their son Rick, and daughter Karen leave suburban Los Angeles on a camping trip to the Sierra Nevada wilderness after sunrise. On the way, the Baldwins notice an unusually bright light behind them. Sporadic news reports broadcast on CONELRAD hint at the start of an atomic war, confirmed when the Baldwins see a large mushroom cloud rising over Los Angeles. The family attempt to return home and rescue Ann's mother. Harry soon realizes that the roads will be clogged by panicked people, and what is left of the city will be saturated in atomic fallout. Declaring that his family's survival must come first, Harry decides to continue to their vacation spot and weather the crisis from there.

The Baldwins stop to buy supplies at a small town off the main road, which has not yet been inundated by refugees from Los Angeles. Harry attempts to purchase tools and guns from hardware store owner Ed Johnson with a personal check. However, Johnson believes only Los Angeles has been hit and the government remains intact, so he insists on following state law and withholding the guns for a 24 hours while Harry's checks are verified. Harry absconds with the weapons with Rick's help, but he tells Johnson that he will eventually return and pay for them in full. Back on the road, the family encounter three threatening young hoodlums, Carl, Mickey, and Andy, but manage to fend them off.

After a harrowing journey, the Baldwins reach their destination and find shelter in a cave, where they settle in and wait for civil order to be restored. On their portable radio, they listen to war news and learn that what remains of the United Nations has declared this to be "Year Zero". Harry and Rick discover that Ed Johnson and his wife have coincidentally set up camp nearby, but not for long: the three hoodlums arrive and murder the Johnsons.

While doing laundry, Ann drops a blouse in a stream, alerting the hoodlums to the Baldwins' presence. They accost and rape Karen, but Ann scares them off with a rifle. Harry and Rick begin a search for the rapists and find two of them at a farm house, where Harry kills them. The Baldwins also discover a teenage girl, Marilyn, kept in a locked room as a sex slave. When questioned, she explains that she lived at the house with her parents before they were murdered by the three hoodlums. Marilyn is freed and brought to the cave, where she is cared for by Ann and accepted into the Baldwin family.

Sometime later, Marilyn accompanies Rick while he chops wood outside the camp. Carl, the third hoodlum, sneaks up behind Marilyn and forces her to drop her rifle. He questions her about what happened to his buddies. Rick throws a piece of wood at Carl, allowing Marilyn to slip out of his grasp. She grabs the rifle and kills Carl. During the confrontation, Carl manages to shoot Rick in the leg.

The Baldwins leave their camp to find a doctor named Strong, whom Marilyn knows in the nearby town of Paxton. On the drive there, the group hears that "the enemy" has requested a truce and "Year Zero" is ending. Doctor Strong stabilizes Rick, but he warns that the young man will die without a blood transfusion. The closest place that can handle the procedure is an Army hospital more than 100 miles (160 km) away. En route to the hospital, the Baldwins are stopped by an Army patrol. After a tense conversation, they are allowed to continue. The soldiers watch the Baldwins leave and note that the family is among the "good ones" who escaped radiation sickness by being in the mountains when the atomic bombs exploded. As the Baldwins drive on, an end title card states: "There must be no end – only a new beginning".

Cast
 Ray Milland as Harry Baldwin
 Jean Hagen as Ann Baldwin
 Frankie Avalon as Rick Baldwin, son
 Mary Mitchel as Karen Baldwin, daughter
 Joan Freeman as Marilyn Hayes
 Richard Bakalyan as Carl
 Rex Holman as Mickey
 Richard Garland as Ed Johnson, hardware store owner
 Willis Bouchey as Dr. Powell Strong
 Neil Nephew as Andy
 O.Z. Whitehead as Hogan, grocery store owner
 Russ Bender as Harkness
 Shary Marshall as Bobbie Johnson
 Byron Morrow as Evacuee from Newhall
 Hugh Sanders as Evacuee from Chatsworth

Production
The film was originally known as Survival. Samuel Z. Arkoff of AIP said Avalon and Milland were teamed together because "they both have particular types of followers and the combination adds up to an attraction."

Roger Corman later said about the film, "the subject was exciting, but the technicians who worked on the film, who were my technicians, told me that Ray had been somewhat overwhelmed. He wasn’t organized enough to act and direct at the same time. He lost time on a three-week scene and forgot his scenes."

Reception
Frankie Avalon later said, "The film came out to real good reviews." American International Pictures sent the star around the country to promote it. He went on to say, "We did a tour of theaters in Los Angeles, and it made its money back just in Los Angeles alone."

This success led to Avalon making a number of films with AIP.

Critical
Michael Atkinson, the film critic for The Village Voice, liked the film and wrote in 2005, "This forgotten, saber-toothed 1962 AIP cheapie might be the most expressive on-the-ground nightmare of the Cold War era, providing a template not only for countless social-breakdown genre flicks (most particularly, Michael Haneke's Time of the Wolf) but also for authentic crisis—shades of New Orleans haunt its DVD margins...the movie is nevertheless an anxious, detail-rich essay on moral collapse."

Glenn Erickson writes, in his DVD Savant review, "Panic In Year Zero! scrupulously avoids any scenes requiring more than minimalist production values yet still delivers on its promise, allowing audience imagination to expand upon the narrow scope of what's actually on the screen. It sure seemed shocking in 1962, and easily trumped other more pacifistic efforts. The Day the Earth Caught Fire was for budding flower people; Panic In Year Zero! could have been made as a sales booster for the gun industry."

See also
 List of American films of 1962
 List of apocalyptic films
 List of nuclear holocaust fiction
 Survival film, about the film genre, with a list of related films

References

Bibliography
 Warren, Bill. Keep Watching the Skies: American Science Fiction Films of the Fifties (note: covers films up through 1962), 21st Century Edition. Jefferson, North Carolina: McFarland & Company, 2009, .

External links
 
 
 
 
 

1962 films
1960s science fiction films
American International Pictures films
American disaster films
American black-and-white films
Films about nuclear war and weapons
Films based on science fiction novels
Films directed by Ray Milland
Films scored by Les Baxter
CinemaScope films
Films set in California
Films shot in California
American post-apocalyptic films
Films about World War III
1960s English-language films
1960s American films